The Collège-lycée Ampère is a famous school located in the 2nd arrondissement of Lyon.

History
It was founded in 1519 by members of the Brotherhood of the Trinity. It was then known under the name of Collège de la Trinité. Under this name it was directed by the Jesuits from 1565 to 1762, then by the Oratorians until 1792.

During the French Revolution, the building was occupied by the troops of the National Convention and renamed École centrale. Napoléon Bonaparte, then First Consul, was proclaimed President of the Italian Republic during a gathering called the 'consulte de Lyon' in the high chapel of the school and with a consular order of vendémiaire 24 year XI (16 October 1802), the property was transformed into Lycée impérial. Under the Restoration, it was renamed Collège royal, until the French Revolution of 1848, when it became the Lycée de Lyon.

In 1888, it was named Lycée Ampère as tribute to the physician André-Marie Ampère.

It was the first mixed college in France. The poet Louise Labe, as well as Pernette du Guillet, studied at this school. This experience allowed commoners to access education. With their mentor, Maurice Scève, Louise Labe, daughter of tailpiece, Pernette and others, formed what was called the 'École de Lyon', a famous poets humanist association.

Chapel of the Trinity

The chapel of the Trinity also called 'high chapel' was built in the College-lycée Ampère between 1617 and 1622 in the baroque style and the first stone was blessed by archbishop Denis-Simon de Marquemont. In 1754, it was refurbished by the Lyon architect planner Jean-Antoine Morand. Classified monument historique in 1939, it was neglected and even served as the gym. Restored in the 1990s, it now hosts regular classical music concerts.

Nowadays
The institution is acknowledged for the high quality of its preparatory classes to management Grandes Écoles entrance examination. Also, it is reputed for the variety of rare foreign languages available to students, among which Hebrew, Russian, Arabic and Japanese.

Famous pupils and professors

André-Marie Ampère
Marc Burty
Claude-François Menestrier
François d'Aix de la Chaise
Charles Baudelaire
Edgar Quinet
Édouard Herriot
Édouard Daladier
Robert Badinter
André Latreille
Albin Chalandon
Michel Noir
Bernard Pivot

Louis Maynard
Marcel Maréchal
Marc Riboud

Jean-Jacques Brochier
Philippe Riboud
Raymond Domenech
Charles Touzot
Gaspard Monge

See also

 Catholic Church in France
 Education in France
 List of Jesuit schools

References

External links

 Official website

Universities and colleges in Lyon
2nd arrondissement of Lyon
Jesuit elementary and primary schools in France
1519 establishments in France
Lycées in Auvergne-Rhône-Alpes
Jesuit secondary schools in France
Jesuit universities and colleges
Educational institutions established in the 1510s